The Testaments is a 2019 novel by Margaret Atwood. It is the sequel to The Handmaid's Tale (1985). The novel is set 15 years after the events of The Handmaid's Tale. It is narrated by Aunt Lydia, a character from the previous novel; Agnes, a young woman living in Gilead; and Daisy, a young woman living in Canada.

The Testaments was a joint winner of the 2019 Booker Prize, alongside Bernardine Evaristo's novel Girl, Woman, Other. It was also voted 'Best Fiction' novel in the Goodreads Choice Awards 2019, winning by over 50,000 votes.

Streaming service Hulu, which also produces the Handmaid's Tale series, announced in 2022 that The Testaments will also become a series after the Handmaid's Tale's final season concludes. Actress Ann Dowd will reprise her role as Aunt Lydia.

Plot summary
The novel alternates among the perspectives of three women, presented as portions of a manuscript written by one (the Ardua Hall Holograph) and testimonies by the other two.

Lydia, a divorced judge, is imprisoned with other women in a stadium during the establishment of Gilead. After enduring weeks of squalid conditions, torture, and solitary confinement, she and a small group of other women are handpicked by Commander Judd and Vidala, a pre-existing supporter of Gilead, to become Aunts—an elite group of women tasked with creating and overseeing the laws and uniforms governing Gilead's women. The Aunts use Ardua Hall as their headquarters and enjoy certain privileges that include reading "forbidden" texts, such as Cardinal John Henry Newman's Apologia Pro Vita Sua. In secret, Aunt Lydia despises Gilead and becomes a mole supplying critical information to the Mayday resistance organization.

Fifteen years after the events of The Handmaid's Tale, a girl named Agnes Jemima is growing up in Boston as the adopted daughter of Commander Kyle and his wife Tabitha. Agnes has a loving relationship with Tabitha, who later dies of ill health. Agnes and her classmates Becka and Shunammite attend an elite preparatory school for the daughters of Commanders, where they are taught to run a household, but not to become literate. Once widowed, Commander Kyle marries Paula, the widow of a deceased Commander, who despises Agnes. Desiring a child for herself, she acquires a Handmaid, who successfully conceives but later dies giving birth to a son. Agnes is arranged to be married to Commander Judd, now a high-ranking official in charge of the Eyes and surveilling the population of Gilead.

Learning that she is the daughter of a Handmaid, Agnes manages to escape her arranged marriage by becoming a Supplicant, a prospective Aunt. In that pursuit she joins Becka, whose father—Doctor Grove, a prominent dentist—has been sexually abusing her and his other underage female patients for years. Later, Agnes is anonymously provided with files highlighting the corruption and hypocrisy at the heart of Gilead, specifically evidence of adultery between Commander Kyle and Paula and their plots to murder their respective spouses since divorce is prohibited. She also learns that she is the half-sister of "Baby Nicole", a girl who was smuggled out of Gilead to Canada by her Handmaid mother when she was young (and whose return the government of Gilead has been demanding).

Meanwhile, a girl named Daisy—several years younger than Agnes—grows up in Toronto's Queen Street West with her adoptive parents, Neil and Melanie. The couple owns a second-hand clothes shop serving as a front for Mayday to smuggle women out of Gilead. On her 16th birthday, Daisy's adoptive parents are murdered by undercover Gilead operatives. Daisy is spirited into hiding by several Mayday operatives, who reveal that Daisy is actually Nicole. The Mayday operatives enlist her in a mission to infiltrate Gilead to obtain valuable intelligence from their mysterious mole. Nicole poses as a street urchin named Jade to be recruited by the Pearl Girls (Gilead missionaries who lure foreign women to Gilead with the promise of a better life), who take her up and bring her into Gilead.

The disguised Nicole is placed under the care of Agnes and Becka, who are now respectively named Aunts Victoria and Immortelle. Aunt Lydia confirms that "Jade" is Nicole through a tattoo and discloses her true identity and parentage to Agnes and Becka. Revealing herself as Mayday's mole, Aunt Lydia enlists the three young women to smuggle incriminating information about Gilead's elite into Canada. Nicole is tasked with carrying the files inside a microdot on her cruciform tattoo. Agnes and Nicole are to enter Canada disguised as Pearl Girls, with Nicole impersonating Becka. The real Becka, disguised as Jade, is to remain at the Hall and provide a diversion once Nicole is found missing. Forced to hasten their plans when Commander Judd learns about Nicole's presence and intends to marry her, Agnes and Nicole set out early, where they hospitalise Aunt Vidala in the process. They travel by bus and on foot, then by boat along the Penobscot River. This boat takes them to a larger vessel which brings them into Canadian waters. Agnes and Nicole manage to reach Campobello Island by an inflatable and are picked up by a Mayday team. Meanwhile, Aunt Lydia, to buy Agnes and Nicole some more time and to secure her own position at Ardua Hall, tells Aunt Elizabeth that Aunt Vidala accused her of attacking her, expecting Elizabeth to kill Vidala.

Using the information inside Nicole's microdot, the Canadian media leaks scandalous information about Gilead's elite, which leads to a purge that in turn causes a military coup, bringing about the collapse of Gilead and the subsequent restoration of the United States. Agnes and Nicole are reunited with their mother. Becka dies while hiding in a cistern to perpetuate the ruse that "Jade" had run off with a plumber. Lydia, the author of the Ardua Hall Holograph, closes her story by describing her plan to commit suicide with a morphine overdose before she can be questioned and executed.

The novel concludes with a metafictional epilogue, described as a partial transcript at the Thirteenth Symposium on Gileadean Studies in 2197, presented by Professor James Darcy Pieixoto. He talks about the challenges in verifying the authenticity of the Ardua Hall Holograph and the two witness transcripts by Agnes and Nicole. He also speculates that Agnes and Nicole's Handmaid mother could be Offred of the previous book, though he himself admits to not being sure. He concludes by mentioning the statue that was made commemorating Becka for her actions, its dedication having been attended by Agnes and Nicole, their husbands and children, their mother and their respective fathers.

Characters

Aunt Lydia
The first protagonist, Aunt Lydia, first appeared as an antagonist in The Handmaid's Tale. She chronicles her life in an illicit manuscript, including details of her life before Gilead and how she came to be made an Aunt. She also meditates on the inner workings of Gilead's theonomy, its hypocrisy, and endemic corruption. Lydia's manuscript is later published as the Ardua Hall Holograph, also known as The Testaments.  The provenance of the book, like that of Offred’s which was published as The Handmaid's Tale, is in question. In The Testaments, Aunt Lydia emerges as a woman who accepts that she must do what is necessary to stay alive, but who quietly tries to work within the system to pursue a measure of justice, fairness, and compassion.

Agnes Jemima (Aunt Victoria/Witness 369A)
The second protagonist, Agnes Jemima, is an adoptive child of the high-ranking Commander Kyle and his Wife, Tabitha. She is enrolled in the prestigious Vidala School, where they learn skills such as painting and embroidery - skills thought to be appropriate for the future Wives of Commanders. After Tabitha's death, Commander Kyle marries Paula, who tries to remove Agnes from the family by arranging to marry her off to Commander Judd, who is known to marry young girls and murder them when they grow too old. Agnes escapes this predicament by claiming to have a higher calling and wishing to serve the women of her country. She goes to Ardua Hall as a Supplicant, where she is taught to read and write in preparation to become an Aunt. Here, she takes the name Victoria from the list of approved names for Aunts. She also grows closer to her former classmate Becka, who is another Supplicant studying to become an Aunt.

During the course of her stay at Ardua Hall, she is sent several files from an anonymous source (later revealed to be Aunt Lydia). The files contain details about the various crimes committed by the high-ranking officials of Gilead, thus making Agnes aware of the corruption at the heart of her country. In one such file, she finds out the truth of her parentage - her biological mother was a Handmaid who had escaped to Canada and is currently working for Mayday. She also realizes that her mother had another child, Baby Nicole (later revealed to be Daisy/Jade), who was smuggled to safety in Canada during her infancy. 

She meets her half-sister Nicole at Ardua Hall, and then agrees to go with her to Canada in order to transport documents containing information about the leaders of Gilead.

Nicole (Daisy/Jade/Witness 369B) 
The third protagonist, Nicole, also known as Daisy, is the daughter of a Handmaid who smuggled her out of Gilead and into Canada as a baby. She lives in Toronto with her adoptive parents Neil and Melanie, who own a second-hand clothing store called the Clothes Hound. Like Agnes, Nicole is raised without any knowledge of her true origins. She takes an interest in human rights violations in neighboring Gilead.

Becka (Aunt Immortelle)
A primary supporting character. Like Agnes she is the daughter of a Handmaid adopted by a Gileadean family and is being prepared for a high-status marriage. However, her "father" is not a Commander but rather an important figure, a dentist, in the Gileadean upper class. She holds a dark secret of being the victim of rape and incest.  When she becomes a Supplicant, she takes the name Aunt Immortelle.

Reception 
Serena Davies of The Daily Telegraph described The Testaments as "a lurid and powerful sequel". She concluded: "Atwood has given us a blockbuster of propulsive, almost breathless narrative, stacked with twists and turns worthy of a Gothic novel". In Literary Review, Sarah Crown commends The Testaments as "politically and emotionally satisfying," although it is, compared to The Handmaid's Tale, lacking in "the richness and the sense of jeopardy" as a result of Atwood's exchange of her earlier novel's ambiguity for clarity. 

In an interview by Martha Teichner, for CBS News Sunday Morning, Atwood insisted the novel contains "tons of hope—lots and lots of hope" when questioned about the premise. Michiko Kakutani, writing for The New York Times, contrasts Atwood's thesis of writing one's testimony being an "act of hope", against "the pompous, myopic Gileadean scholars who narrate the satirical epilogues" of both The Handmaid's Tale and The Testaments.

The book was shortlisted for the 2020 Fiction Book of the Year in the British Book Awards.

Relationship to television series 
Atwood wrote The Testaments in coordination with the ongoing The Handmaid's Tale television series, letting the producers know where she was taking the sequel and affirming certain characters' storylines are not impacted by how they appear in The Testaments, since the setting of the television series is several years away from directly portraying events in this novel. Bruce Miller, producer of the television series, has acknowledged the new novel's storyline will be taken into account as the series continues.

Formats
The novel was released simultaneously as a book and as an audiobook featuring Ann Dowd reprising and narrating the lead role of Aunt Lydia. Atwood said that Dowd's performance as Aunt Lydia in the TV series helped inspire the new novel. The role of Agnes is read by Bryce Dallas Howard, while Daisy/Nicole is read by Mae Whitman. Tantoo Cardinal and Derek Jacobi read the roles of scholars in the epilogue. The audiobook also features Atwood herself.

In a separate adaption, BBC Radio 4 in 2019 serialized the novel in 15 quarter-hour episodes.

References

External links 
 
 

2019 science fiction novels
Novels by Margaret Atwood
2019 Canadian novels
Sequel novels
McClelland & Stewart books
Canadian speculative fiction novels
Novels set in fictional countries
Novels set in Toronto
Booker Prize-winning works
The Handmaid's Tale
Novels adapted into radio programs